Alan Dickinson is a former professional rugby league footballer who played in the 1960s, 1970s and 1980s.

Playing career

County honours
Alan Dickinson won a cap for Yorkshire while at Castleford; he played left-, i.e. number 8, in the 12-12 draw with Cumberland at Recreation Ground, Whitehaven on Tuesday 15 February 1977.

County Cup Final appearances
Alan Dickinson played left-, i.e. number 11, in Castleford's 7-11 defeat by Hull Kingston Rovers in the 1971 Yorkshire County Cup Final during the 1971–72 season at Belle Vue, Wakefield on Saturday 21 August 1971.

BBC2 Floodlit Trophy Final appearances
Alan Dickinson played right-, i.e. number 10, in Castleford's 12-4 victory over Leigh in the 1976 BBC2 Floodlit Trophy Final during the 1976–77 season at Hilton Park, Leigh on Tuesday 14 December 1976.

Player's No.6 Trophy Final appearances
Alan Dickinson played right-, i.e. number 10, in Castleford's 25-15 victory over Blackpool Borough in the 1976–77 Player's No.6 Trophy Final during the 1976–77 season at The Willows, Salford on Saturday 22 January 1977.

Club career
Alan Dickinson made his début for Wakefield Trinity during April 1981, and he played his last match for Wakefield Trinity during the 1980–81 season.

References

External links
Alan Dickinson Memory Box Search at archive.castigersheritage.com
Search for "Alan Dickinson" at britishnewspaperarchive.co.uk

1940s births
Living people
Castleford Tigers players
Dewsbury Rams players
English rugby league players
Keighley Cougars players
Place of birth missing (living people)
Rugby league centres
Rugby league five-eighths
Rugby league hookers
Rugby league second-rows
Rugby league props
Wakefield Trinity players
Year of birth missing (living people)
Yorkshire rugby league team players